Pattithara  is a village in Palakkad district in the state of Kerala, India.

Demographics
 India census, Pattithara had a population of 30819 with 14660 males and 16159 females.

The original name of the place was Bhattithara, which then shrunk to become Pattithara. The origin lies in the Bhattiyil Shiva Temple in the village.

Suburbs and Villages
 Chittappuram, Malamakkavu Road and Kudallur
 Manniyam Perumbalam and Panniyoor

Notable persons

Important Landmarks
kundukadu juma masjidh
UNITED KUNDUKADU, kundukadu green city
 Bhattiyil Shiva Temple
 Kudallur Juma Masjidh
 Bahathul Islam Madrassah, Kudallur
 Manniyam Perumbalam Juma Masjidh
 Sree Chammundeswari Temple,  Aloor
 Kodalil Palakkal Siva Temple, Aloor
 Karanapra Durga Temple,  Aloor
 Pooleri GarudaroodaTemple, Aloor
 Pallikulangara Ayappa Temple,  Aloor
 Areympadam Bhagavathi Temple, Pattithara
 Navayuga pattithara
 millumpadi pattithara
 Amigoz pattithara
 Sulthanpadi pattithara
 Gramadeepam patttithara
Brothers library pattithara

References

Villages in Palakkad district